Teiranes (flourished 3rd century – died 278) was a Roman client king of the Bosporan Kingdom. Like the other late Bosporan kings, Teiranes is known only from coinage, which means his relationship to the other kings is unknown, as are details of his accession and reign. His coins are known from the period 276–278. In 276, he apparently co-ruled with his predecessor Rhescuporis V and another king, Sauromates IV. It is possible that Teiranes was the son of Sauromates III and a brother Rhescuporis V.

See also
 Bosporan Kingdom
 Roman Crimea

References

Monarchs of the Bosporan Kingdom
Roman client rulers
279 deaths
3rd-century monarchs in Europe
Year of birth unknown
Teiranes, Tiberius